Saptha divitiosa is a moth in the family Choreutidae. It was described by Francis Walker in 1864. It is found on Seram and Ambon islands in Indonesia.

References

Choreutidae
Moths described in 1864